French military mission to Japan may refer to:
French military mission to Japan (1867–1868), to found the Denshūtai corps of elite troops
French military mission to Japan (1872–1880), to reorganize the Imperial Japanese Army
French military mission to Japan (1884–1889), which influenced the Imperial Japanese Navy
French military mission to Japan (1918–1919), to establish the Japanese air force